A gubernatorial election was held on 29 August 2010 to elect the next governor of , a prefecture of Japan located in the north of the Shikoku island.

Takeki Manabe, 70, incumbent since 1998, former public servant, was not seeking reelection.

Candidates 

Keizo Hamada, 58, finance bureaucrat. He was supported by LDP, New Komeito, DPJ and SDP. 
Akio Matsubara, 54, backed by the JCP.
Satoko Watanabe, 56, supported by citizens movements and Midori no Mirai.

Results

References 

2010 elections in Japan
Kagawa gubernational elections
Politics of Kagawa Prefecture